Pre-Roman Britain may refer to:
British Iron Age, the period immediately before the arrival of the Romans
Prehistoric Britain in general